Aacayipsin (You're Different) is the 1994 album of the Turkish pop singer Tarkan. The album was published in Europe and Asia. This was his second album, the success of which launched him as a superstar onto the Turkish pop scene with over 2.5 million copies sold worldwide. The album also sold over 750 thousand copies in Europe, a first-ever feat for a Turkish performer.

Track listing 

"Şeytan Azapta (Remix)" 5:17

Album credits
 Personnel Crew
 Mixing: Riza Erekli, Pinyo Deneb, Ozan Çolakoğlu
 Mastering: Duyal Karagözoğlu
 Publishers: Onur Ofset
 Photography: Sevil Sert

Guest musicians
 Background vocals:
 Cihan Okan
 Deniz Arcak
 Ebru Aydın
 Levent Yüksel
 Orhan Atasoy
 Özkan Uğur
 Rıza Erekli
 Şebnem Ferah
 Sertab Erener
 Ümit Sayın
 Instruments:
 Piano – Ozan Çolakoğlu (piano introduction for track 3)
 Acoustic Guitar – Erdem Sökmen, Erdinç Şenyaylar
 Bass guitar – İsmail Soyberk, Levent Yüksel
 Electric Guitar – Gür Akad
 Cello – Özer Arkun
 Oud – Erdinç Şenyaylar, Levent Yüksel
 Kanun – Halil Karaduman
 Strings – Şenyaylar Yaylı Grubu
 Clarinet – Mustafa Süder
 Flute – Levent Altındağ
 Ney – Ercan Irmak
 Percussion – Cem Erman
 Darbuka – Celal-Seyfi Ayta

Music videos
 "Hepsi Senin Mi?"
 "Dön Bebeğim" (Some of the opening scenes were cut because the director decided they were too raunchy for Turkish TV.)
 "Şeytan Azapta" (This video was filmed with a remix of the original album edit that has never been released.)
 "Bekle" (Rarely seen music video filmed when Tarkan was in Singapore for a concert.)
 "Kış Güneşi" (Tarkan uses his own family pictures for the making of this video.)
 "Unutmamalı"
 "Gül Döktüm Yollarına"

Notes

External links
 Tarkan Translations
 Album Song Lyrics in English

Tarkan (singer) albums
1994 albums